Charles M. Reigeluth is an American educational theorist, researcher, and reformer. His research focuses on instructional design theories and systemic transformation of educational systems to be learner-centered: personalized, competency-based, and largely project-based.

Reigeluth has a B.A. in economics from Harvard University and a Ph.D. in instructional psychology from Brigham Young University. He is a professor emeritus at the Instructional Systems Technology Department at Indiana University and is a former chairman of the department.

Instructional Design Theories 
Instructional design theories created by Reigeluth include Elaboration Theory and Simulation theory.

In Elaboration Theory, content to be learned is arranged so that concepts that are more simple and general build up to progressively narrower and more detailed concepts, thereby placing new content in a meaningful context, consistent with schema theory.

Simulation Theory offers guidance for the design of three parts of a simulation: the scenario, the underlying model, and the instructional overlay.  The theory focuses on the instructional overlay, offering a general model and variations on the general model.

Reigeluth is best known for his four edited volumes on Instructional-Design Theories and Models, which provide descriptions of a wide variety of instructional-design theories by the creators of those theories, along with chapters by Reigeluth on the nature of instructional-design theories and the theory-building process.  Design theories are different from descriptive theories in that they are goal oriented, offering guidance about which methods should be used to achieve different kinds of goals in different situations—what Herbert Simon referred to as a "design science".  These four volumes have several uncommon elements, including a foreword for every theory chapter that outlines the theory’s goals, values, and methods, and editor’s notes that compare aspects of each theory with other theories.  Volume I, subtitled An Overview of their Current Status, was published in 1983.  Volume II, subtitled A New Paradigm of Instructional Theory, was published in 1999.  Volume III, subtitled Building a Common Knowledge Base, was published in 2009.  And Volume IV, subtitled The Learner-Centered Paradigm of Education, was published in 2017. Reigeluth asserted that the primary goal of instructional design is enhancing human learning and development (1999, p. ix).

Transformation of Educational Systems 
Reigeluth's findings over 20 years of research on systemic transformation of educational systems are summarized in two books. Reinventing Schools: It's Time to Break the Mold, coauthored with Jennifer Karnopp (2013, Rowman & Littlefield).  The book argues for paradigm changes to make educational systems learner-centered. Vision and Action: Reinventing Schools through Personalized Competency-Based Education, also coauthored with Jennifer Karnopp (2020, Marzano Resources). The book provides a comprehensive guide to implementing personalized competency-based education (PCBE). PCBE is posited as the system most capable of preparing students for life in the postindustrial age. This book is broken into two complementary parts - vision and action.  K-12 school and district leaders, teachers, and stakeholders will define their own PCBE vision, and they will learn how to act to transform to that vision in their school or district.

Reigeluth led a research team at Indiana University to investigate the technology requirements for the learner-centered paradigm of education.  The team identified four major functions for technology: recordkeeping, planning and setting goals, instruction, and assessment. Use of technology in these ways allows teachers to focus more on social, emotional, and character development.

To address the lack of relevance of most educational research to improving educational practice, Reigeluth developed a research method called Formative Research, a kind of what later came to be called Design-Based Research, to improve the usefulness of instructional-design theory.  It is a kind of action research and case-study research that identifies which methods work well in different situations, which ones do not work well in different situations, and how to improve the methods used in different situations.

Books 
Reigeluth has authored or edited 12 books and over 170 journal articles and book chapters.  Six of his books have received “outstanding book” awards from the Association for Educational Communications and Technology (AECT).  In 2002 he received the Honored Alumni Award from Brigham Young University's David O. McKay School of Education, and in 2001 he received the Distinguished Service Award from AECT.

Books he has written include:
Instructional Design Theories and Models, Volumes I, II, III and IV
Instructional Theories in Action" Extended Task Analysis ProcedureInstructional Design Strategies and TacticsComprehensive Systems Design: A New Educational TechnologySystemic Change in EducationSystemic Restructuring in Education: A Selected BibliographyReinventing Schools: It's Time to Break the MoldVision and Action: Reinventing Schools through Personalized Competency-Based Education''

References

External links
Profile at Indiana University
Reigeluth
Reinventing Schools: It's Time to Break the Mold

Indiana University faculty
Living people
Harvard University alumni
Brigham Young University alumni
Year of birth missing (living people)